Voice Within or Voices Within may refer to:

TV and film
Voices Within: The Lives of Truddi Chase, ABC-Network miniseries based on the autobiography of Truddi Chase
The Voice Within (film), a 1946 British film

Music
 A Voice Within, a 2014 album by Intervals 
Voices Within, 1999 album by Ilse Huizinga
Voices from Within, a 2008 album by Israeli metal band Distorted
"The Voice Within", song by Christina Aguilera 2002